Clemens Riedel (born 19 July 2003) is a German footballer who plays as a defender for  club Darmstadt 98.

Career
Bundesliga defeat to Jahn Regensburg.

References

External links

2003 births
Living people
German footballers
Association football defenders
SV Darmstadt 98 players
2. Bundesliga players